Elections to Inverclyde Council were held on 6 May 1999, the same day as other Scottish Local Government elections and the first Scottish Parliament Election.

This was the second election using 20 single member wards, in which the Scottish Labour Party won a majority of seats, winning 11.

Election Results

Ward results 

e

References 

1999
1999 Scottish local elections